Mario Bava (31 July 1914 – 27 April 1980) was an Italian filmmaker who worked variously as a director, cinematographer, special effects artist and screenwriter, frequently referred to as the "Master of Italian Horror" and the "Master of the Macabre". His low-budget genre films, known for their distinctive visual flair and stylish technical ingenuity, feature recurring themes and imagery concerning the conflict between illusion and reality, as well as the destructive capacity of human nature. He was a pioneer of Italian genre cinema, and is regarded as one of the most influential auteurs of the horror film genre.

After providing special effects work and other assistance on productions like Hercules (1958) and Caltiki – The Immortal Monster (1959), Bava made his official feature directorial debut with the horror film Black Sunday, released in 1960. He went on to direct such films as The Girl Who Knew Too Much, Black Sabbath, The Whip and the Body (all released in 1963), Blood and Black Lace (1964), Planet of the Vampires (1965), Kill, Baby, Kill (1966), Danger: Diabolik (1968), A Bay of Blood (1971), Baron Blood (1972), Lisa and the Devil (1974) and Rabid Dogs (1974).

According to the British Film Institute, "Bava took a vital role in the creation of the modern horror film. If there was to be a Mount Rushmore-style monument dedicated to four directors whose work pioneered a new form of big screen chills and thrills, those giant faces etched in granite on the mountainside would be: Bava, Alfred Hitchcock, Georges Franju and Michael Powell."

Family 
Born to sculptor, cinematographer and special effects pioneer Eugenio Bava, the younger Mario Bava followed his father into the film industry, and eventually earned a reputation as one of Italy's foremost cameramen, lighting and providing the special effects for such films as Hercules (1958) and its sequel Hercules Unchained (1959) (both were lampooned on Mystery Science Theater 3000). 

Mario Bava's son and frequent assistant director Lamberto Bava, later became a noted fantasy and horror film director in his own right.

Biography 

Mario Bava was born in Sanremo, Liguria on 31 July 1914. He was the son of Eugenio Bava (1886-1966), a sculptor who also worked as a special effects photographer and cameraman in the Italian silent movie industry. Mario Bava's first ambition was to become a painter. Unable to turn out paintings at a profitable rate, he went into his father's business, working as an assistant to other Italian cinematographers like Massimo Terzano. He also helped his father at the special effects department at Benito Mussolini's film factory, the Istituto Luce.

Bava became a cinematographer himself in 1939, shooting two short films with Roberto Rossellini. He made his feature debut in the early 1940s. Bava's camerawork was an instrumental factor in developing the screen personas of such stars of the period as Gina Lollobrigida, Steve Reeves and Aldo Fabrizi.

During the late 1950s, his eventual career trajectory as a director began when he was relied upon to complete projects begun by or credited to his colleague Riccardo Freda and other filmmakers, including I Vampiri (1957) (the first Italian horror film of the sound era), The Day the Sky Exploded (1958) (the first Italian science fiction film), Caltiki – The Immortal Monster (1959) and The Giant of Marathon (1959).

Bava collaborates in I vampiri (a.k.a. The Devil's Commandment) for director Riccardo Freda in 1956, a movie now referred to as the first Italian horror film. Bava was originally hired as the cinematographer, but when Freda walked out on the project midway through production, Bava completed the film in several days, even creating the innovative special effects that were needed. He also handled the cinematography and special effects on the 1955 Kirk Douglas epic Ulysses and the 1957 Steve Reeves classic Hercules, two films credited with sparking the Italian sword and sandal genre.

Bava co-directed The Day the Sky Exploded in 1958, the first Italian science fiction film, predating even the sci-fi films of Antonio Margheriti. Because he had no earlier credited experience as a director, the film was credited solely to Paolo Heusch.

In 1960, Bava directed the gothic horror classic Black Sunday, his first solo directorial effort, which made a genre star out of Barbara Steele. His use of light and dark in black-and-white films is widely acclaimed along with his spectacular use of color in films such as Black Sabbath, Kill, Baby... Kill!,  Blood and Black Lace and The Whip and the Body.

Later works
His work has proven to be very influential. Bava directed two films that are now regarded as the earliest entries in the Italian giallo genre: The Girl Who Knew Too Much (1963) and Blood and Black Lace (1964). His 1965 science fiction horror film Planet of the Vampires was a thematic precursor to Alien (1979). Although comic books had served as the basis for countless serials and children's films in Hollywood, Bava's Danger: Diabolik (1968) brought an adult perspective to the genre; the movie was influenced by Pop artists Andy Warhol and Roy Lichtenstein. Many elements of the 1966 film Kill, Baby... Kill!, regarded by Martin Scorsese as Bava's masterpiece, also appear in the Asian strain of terror film known as J-horror. 1971's A Bay of Blood is considered one of the early slasher films, and was explicitly imitated in Friday the 13th Part 2.

Bava was disappointed with the theatrical distribution of some of his later films. His Lisa and the Devil (1972) never was selected by a distributor. Eventually, in order to get it released, the producer reedited the movie into an Exorcist clone, adding footage shot in 1975, and retitling it House of Exorcism. Bava's Semaforo Rosso (1974) never was released theatrically during his lifetime, and in the late 1990s, it also would be reedited, with new footage added, and retitled; it was released on video as Rabid Dogs. It was released on DVD in 2007, slightly altered and again retitled, as Kidnapped.

In 1977, Bava directed his last horror film, Shock. His son, Lamberto Bava, was an uncredited co-director. The elder Bava later did special effects matte work on Dario Argento's 1980 film Inferno. Bava died suddenly of a heart attack on 27 April 1980, at age 65. His doctor had given him a physical just a few days before, and had pronounced him to be in perfect health. At the time of his death, Bava was about to start shooting a science fiction film titled Star Riders, on which Luigi Cozzi had hoped to collaborate.

Filmography

Feature films

Influence and legacy
Although most of Bava's films as director failed to achieve major commercial success upon release, many eventually found acclaim as cult classics, with their content and production values being favourably compared to the works of Alfred Hitchcock. Despite his reputation as a talented artist during his lifetime, Bava's shy, self-deprecating demeanour prevented him from taking advantage of opportunities that would have furthered his international standing within the film industry, and he turned down multiple opportunities to work in Hollywood.

Mario Bava's son Lamberto Bava worked for 14 years as Bava's assistant director (beginning with Planet of the Vampires), and became a horror film director. On several of Mario's movies, Mario was credited as John M. Old. Later, Lamberto was sometimes credited as John M. Old, Jr. When Lamberto directed his first solo film Macabre in 1980 and screened the completed work for his father, Mario commented jokingly to Lamberto: "I am very proud of you. Now I can die in peace". (He actually did die less than two months later.)

Several books have been published about Mario Bava: Mario Bava by Pascal Martinet (Edilig, 1984) and Mario Bava edited by Jean-Louis Leutrat (Éditions du Céfal, 1994) in French; Mario Bava by Alberto Pezzotta (Il Castoro Cinema, 1995) in Italian; The Haunted Worlds of Mario Bava by Troy Howarth (FAB Press, 2002) and most recently, the massive critical biography Mario Bava: All the Colors of the Dark by Tim Lucas (Video Watchdog, 2007).

A documentary about him titled Mario Bava: Maestro of the Macabre was released in 2000.

Mario Bava's directing style has heavily influenced many directors including Joe Dante, Martin Scorsese, Quentin Tarantino, Francis Ford Coppola, John Landis, and Tim Burton. Bava and his works have also influenced Dario Argento, Lucio Fulci, Federico Fellini, John Carpenter, Nicolas Winding Refn, Roger Corman, Edgar Wright and Jennifer Kent.

The satirical TV series Mystery Science Theater 3000 concluded their show in 1999 with Danger: Diabolik.

See also
European art cinema
Exploitation film
Cinema of Italy

References

Bibliography

External links 
 
 Color Me Bava on Fandor's official YouTube channel
 Great Directors article on Senses of Cinema

1914 births
1980 deaths
People from Sanremo
Italian film directors
Giallo film directors
Horror film directors
Italian cinematographers